The 1967 Penn Quakers football team was an American football team that represented the University of Pennsylvania during the 1967 NCAA University Division football season. Penn finished sixth in the Ivy League. 

In their third year under head coach Bob Odell, the Quakers compiled a 3–6 record and were outscored 237 to 173. Wes Scovanner was the team captain.

Penn's 2-5 conference record placed sixth in the Ivy League. The Quakers were outscored 186 to 111 by Ivy opponents. 

Penn played its home games at Franklin Field on the university's campus in Philadelphia, Pennsylvania.

Schedule

References

Penn
Penn Quakers football seasons
Penn Quakers football